Butyrsky (masculine), Butyrskaya (feminine), or Butyrskoye (neuter) is the name of several rural localities in Russia:
Butyrskoye, Gladyshevsky Selsoviet, Mishkinsky District, Kurgan Oblast, a village in Gladyshevsky Selsoviet of Mishkinsky District in Kurgan Oblast; 
Butyrskoye, Rozhdestvensky Selsoviet, Mishkinsky District, Kurgan Oblast, a selo in Rozhdestvensky Selsoviet of Mishkinsky District in Kurgan Oblast; 
Butyrskaya, Primorsky District, Arkhangelsk Oblast, a village in Koskogorsky Selsoviet of Primorsky District in Arkhangelsk Oblast; 
Butyrskaya, Verkhnetoyemsky District, Arkhangelsk Oblast, a village in Seftrensky Selsoviet of Verkhnetoyemsky District in Arkhangelsk Oblast;